The Nine Lives Tour saw Aerosmith playing in North America, Canada, Japan, the United Kingdom, Germany, Spain, Czech Republic, Belgium, France, Switzerland, Holland, Italy, Austria, Finland, Sweden, Denmark and Portugal. It initially promoted their 1997 release Nine Lives and ran from May 1997 to July 1999.

The length of the tour was due to the chart-topping success of "I Don't Want to Miss a Thing". "We were just about to go off the road and that song came around," explained drummer Joey Kramer. "We continued to tour off that song for another year. That was welcomed by the band. At that time, that was what we did: we would be on the road for twelve or eighteen months, and the only time we came off the road was to make another record."

The tour included a range of support acts. Some opened on entire legs of the tour, others for only half. Some performers appeared at selected dates and others performed just once. They included Shed Seven, Kula Shaker, 3 Colours Red, Jonny Lang, Marry Me Jane, Talk Show, Days of the New, Kenny Wayne Shepherd, Spacehog, Monster Magnet, Fuel, Fighting Gravity, Seven Mary Three, Candlebox, The Afghan Whigs, The Black Crowes, Lenny Kravitz, Bryan Adams, Stereophonics, Skunk Anansie, Ministry and Guano Apes.

Several dates were cancelled, owing to Kramer and singer Steven Tyler recovering from serious injuries that occurred on separate occasions.

Tour dates

Stage setup

The Persian music that signified the start of each concert (whilst the curtains were in place and the band was taking their positions) was "The Feeling Begins" by Peter Gabriel. It can be found on his "Passion" album as well as on the soundtrack to "The Last Temptation of Christ".

Setlist
A standard show on the Nine Lives Tour consisted of 24 tracks, 2 and a half hour stage time. The minimum number of songs played at a show on this tour was 12, and the maximum number of songs played at a show on this tour was 28 songs, played at select shows.

"Cryin'", "Dream On", "Love in an Elevator", "Pink", "Sweet Emotion" and "Walk This Way" were the only songs which were played at every single show on the Nine Lives Tour.  The title track from the new record, "Nine Lives", was the opening song at most shows.

 "Nine Lives"
 "Love in an Elevator"
 "Falling in Love (Is Hard on the Knees)"
 "Eat the Rich"
 "Livin' on the Edge"
 "Dream On"
 "Taste of India"
 "Janie's Got a Gun"
 "What Kind of Love Are You On"
 "Last Child"
 "Rag Doll"
 "Pink"
 "Draw the Line"
 "Stop Messin' Around"
 "Mother Popcorn"
 "intro"
 "Walk This Way"
 "I Don't Wanna Miss A Thing"
 "Cryin'"
 "Dude (Looks Like a Lady)"
 "Come Together"
 "What it Takes"
 "Sweet Emotion"

Notes
From late October 1998 onward, the tour was also called "The Little South of Sanity Tour" given the release of the Geffen live album of the same name.

Problems
A total of 43 shows on the Nine Lives Tour were cancelled and a further 36 shows were rescheduled. The majority of the shows were cancelled/rescheduled due to injuries (Steven Tyler suffered cruciate ligament injury after dropping the microphone stand on his knee, and Joey Kramer suffered second degree burns from a freak accident at a gas station). A select few shows were cancelled/rearranged due to 'scheduling conflict' or the flu.

References

Aerosmith concert tours
1997 concert tours
1998 concert tours
1999 concert tours